Sea Zenith is a four-barrelled 25 mm CIWS used by the Turkish Navy on their MEKO 200 frigates, like the Barbaros and Yavuz classes. It was developed in the 1980s by Oerlikon Contraves (Rheinmetall Air Defence since 2009) around their Oerlikon KBB gun and manufactured in Switzerland. This automatic gun uses a 25x184mm cartridge (longer than the one used by the more common Oerlikon KBA gun) at a rate of 800 rounds a minute. Using four independent guns instead of one multi-barrelled rotary cannon improves reliability. The system is mounted in an enclosed automatic turret and directed by the Seaguard radar developed by Contraves. The turret is tilted back to allow a higher elevation to intercept diving missiles. The system's primary purpose is defence against anti-ship missiles, and other precision guided weapons. However it can also be employed against fixed/rotary wing aircraft, ships and other small craft, coastal targets, and floating mines.

Specifications:
 Caliber: 25 mm
 Barrels: 4 (independent)
 Rate of fire: 3,200 rpm
 Range: 2 km
 Weight: 3500 kg

Sea Zenith had a related development, the Sea Shield system. It was mounted above deck and did not have the high elevation capability of the Sea Zenith. Presented in 1989, it was abandoned in the early 1990s.

The Myriad system, developed by Breda and Contraves (among others) was a related weapon. It used two 25mm 7-barrelled KBD Gatling gun, also developed by Oerlikon. Compared to the Sea Zenith, the firing rate is higher (10,000 rounds a minute), but the effective range is limited to one kilometer.

See also
 Aselsan GOKDENIZ

References

 http://www.janes.com/articles/Janes-Naval-Weapon-Systems/Oerlikon-Contraves-GM25-Sea-Zenith-Switzerland.html
 The Naval Institute guide to world naval weapons systems, 1997-1998; Friedman, Norman
 Naval Institute Guide to Combat Fleets of the World; Wertheim, Eric
 :de:Nahbereichsverteidigungssystem (in German)
 :it:Seaguard (in Italian)

Naval anti-aircraft guns
Autocannon
Close-in weapon systems
Turkish Navy weapon systems
25 mm artillery